Barry LeBrock is an American sportscaster, based in Los Angeles, California.

LeBrock is one of the primary anchors on FSN Final Score, the nightly news program seen Nationally on Fox Sports Net and most affiliates of Comcast SportsNet.

LeBrock's résumé also includes anchor, hosting and investigative reporting work at Fox Sports Net West/Prime Ticket and Fox Sports Net Northwest.

On February 18, 2007, he contributed to the debut of the NASCAR Hot Pass pay-per-view package on DirecTV.  He was the main announcer providing dedicated coverage of NEXTEL Cup Series driver Michael Waltrip.

He was the featured host of DirecTV's StrikeZone Channel, which covered the entire day in Major League Baseball.

He also anchored from the CNN Center in Atlanta CNN International's World sport during the '90.

In 2010, he was announced as a host of Fox Sports Flash, Fox's daily, highly publicized online sports news show.

LeBrock is the author of two books: The Trojan Ten, in-depth accounts of perhaps the ten most important games in the history of USC Trojans football, and "The Front Nine," which chronicles the Greatest Shots in Golf History.

In 2011, he was the play-by-play voice for Long Beach State baseball.

References

American sports announcers
Living people
Year of birth missing (living people)
Baseball announcers